Kazantsevo is a rural locality (a selo) in Shushensky District of Krasnoyarsk Krai, Russia.

The climate is cool in summer and very cold in winter, with temperatures reaching .

References

Rural localities in Krasnoyarsk Krai
Shushensky District